Orekhovka is a municipality in the Kaliningrad Oblast in Russia . It belongs to the local government region of Guryevsky District.

Geographic location 
Orekhovka is situated around 14 kilometers north of Kaliningrad (Königsberg) on State Highway 27K-128, a route which connects Saosyorye (Laptau) on State Highway 27K-070 with Yaroslavskoye (Schönwalde). Until 1945,the nearest rail connection was at Gamsau (Russian: Podgornoye) on the now closed route from Königsberg (Preußen) via Roschino Possindern to Tapiau (Gvardeisk); the Königsberg narrow gauge railway.

History 
Up until 1946, Orekhovka was known as „Poduhren“, a farming village that from 1874 until 1945 belonged to the administrative district of Groß Legden  within the local government region of Königsberg (from 1939 to 1945 Samland), of the Prussian province of East Prussia. In 1910 it had a registered population of 131. On September 30 1928 Poduhren was incorporated into the Municipal County Mantau, and gave up its political independence.

In 1945, along with much of northern East Prussia, Poduhren became a part of the Soviet Union. In 1947 the village was renamed Orekhovo, and as a Soviet Village fell under the jurisdiction of the city of Kaliningrad in Guryevsk Region. From 2008 until 2013 Orekhovo was part of the Municipal County Nisovskoye, and since 2013 it is again part of Guryevsky District.

Church 
Until 1945 the majority of the population were Lutheran Protestants. Orekhovka was part of the parish of the church in Arnau, and was part of the diocese of Königsberg in the archdiocese of Ostpreußen in the Church of the Old Prussian Union. The last German-speaking parish priest was Father Arthur Brodowski.

Since 1990, Orechowka has come within the catchment area of the Church of the Resurrection in Königsberg, a part of the Evangelical Lutheran Church in Russia, Ukraine, Kazakhstan and Central Asia.

References

External links 
 Orechowka bei bankgorodov.ru

Rural localities in Kaliningrad Oblast
Populated places in Guryevsky District, Kaliningrad Oblast